The Citarum River is the longest and largest river in West Java, Indonesia. It is the third longest river in Java, after Bengawan Solo and Brantas. It plays an important role in the life of the people of West Java. It has been noted for being considered one of the most polluted rivers in the world.

History
In Indonesian history the Citarum is linked with the 4th-century Tarumanagara kingdom, as the kingdom and the river shared the same etymology, derived from the word "tarum" (Sundanese for indigo plant). The earlier 4th-century BCE prehistoric Buni clay pottery-making culture flourished near the river's mouth. Stone inscriptions, Chinese sources, and archaeological sites such as Batujaya and Cibuaya suggest that human habitation and civilization flourished in and around the river estuaries and river valley as early as the 4th century and even earlier.

Geography 
The river flows in the northwest area of Java with a predominantly tropical monsoon climate. The annual average temperature in the area is 24 °C. The warmest month is May, when the average temperature is around 26 °C, and the coldest is January, at 22 °C. The average annual rainfall is 2646 mm. The wettest month is January, with an average of 668 mm rainfall, and the driest month is September, with 14 mm rainfall.

Hydroelectric and irrigation dams
Three hydroelectric powerplant dams are installed along the Citarum: Saguling, Cirata, and Ir. H. Djuanda (Jatiluhur), all supplying the electricity for the Bandung and Greater Jakarta areas. The waters from these dams are also used to irrigate vast rice paddies in Karawang and Bekasi area, making northern West Java lowlands one of the most productive rice farming areas.

The Jatiluhur Dam with a 3 billion cubic meter storage capacity has the largest reservoir in Indonesia.

The river makes up around 80 percent of the surface water available to the people who use it. Pollution has affected agriculture so much that farmers have sold their rice paddies for half their normal price.

Pollution

The river is heavily polluted by human activity; about five million people live in its basin. Textile factories in Bandung and Cimahi were major toxic waste contributors. More than 2,000 industries contaminate 5,020 sq miles of the river with lead, mercury, arsenic, and other toxins. According to the documentary Green Warriors Indonesia by Martin Boudot, some of the other toxins include sulphites, nonylphenol, phtalates, PCB 180, paranitrophenol, tributylphosphate. The documentary also mentions that the most dangerous pollution comes from the Indonesian textile industry (with many textile factories being part of Asosiasi Pertekstilan Indonesia). It is also mentioned that the textile factory effluents are only tested on a very select number of parameters. It was thus also proposed in the documentary that a revisal on the textile industry guidelines could include more parameters such as sulphites and heavy metals.

On December 5, 2008, the Asian Development Bank approved a $500 million loan for cleaning up the river, calling it the world's dirtiest.

Environmentalists have observed that over 20,000 tons of waste and 340,000 tons of wastewater from those textile factories are disposed into the river on a daily basis. A result of this pollution has been the elimination of a significant part of the river's fish population estimated at 60% since 2008.

In 2011, the Indonesian government began a river revitalization project, aiming to return the whole river to clean drinking water status.

Revitalization
In November 2011, the river revitalization began, with an expected cost of Rp35 trillion ($4 billion) over 15 years. The revitalization is occurring from Mount Wayang through eight regencies and three cities for a distance of 180 kilometers. The target for the first three years is to collect 10.5 million cubic meters of sedimentation.
In February 2018, the President of Indonesia Joko Widodo launched a seven-year plan to clean up the whole river to achieve clean drinking-water status, ordering 7,000 regular soldiers to clean up allocated sections of the river on a regular basis. They have powers to block up outlets conveying polluted wastewater from factories into the river and are installing rubbish treatment and water treatment facilities. Problems are - lack of money for continuing action, lack of coordination at local level, bribes paid by factories to avoid change, and upstream soil erosion from deforestation that enhances the silting of the lower river. But with wider internet publicity, and now the top-down government enforcement, more foreign consultants are coming in to recommend necessary changes upstream, and local awareness and anti-plastics campaigns are beginning to take effect.

See also
 Water supply and sanitation in Indonesia
 Environmental issues in Indonesia
 Fast fashion
 Buriganga River

References

External links 

Indonesia's Most Polluted River. 101 East, Al Jazeera English, 3. Mai 2018 (video, 25 mins)
Martin Boudot: The world’s most polluted river. DW documentary, 2020 (video, 42 mins)
  
"The 15 most toxic places to live" via Mother Nature Network
 "Sea of Garbage" — pictures of Citarum River pollution
 "The Dirtiest River In The World" — photos
 Citarum — Bahasa (mainly updated) and English website regarding information on Citarum river recovery effort
 Citarum Knowledge Center — information on research, everything from scholarly publications to tool kits for applied research and policy briefs about Citarum River recovery effort. All materials can be freely downloaded from the site.
 "Rescuing The Citarum River." Sometimes Interesting. 09 Nov 2013

Rivers of West Java
Water pollution in Indonesia
Contaminated farmland
Rivers of Indonesia